Taktse International School is a not-for-profit co-educational school located in the foothills of the Indian Himalayas, near Gangtok, Sikkim. Opened in March 2006, the school has residential and day boarding facilities and enrolls students from kindergarten through grade 12.

Academics
Taktse's interdisciplinary and value-conscious curriculum emphasizes cultural awareness and independence. 
Taktse's curriculum includes the following programs:
 Write and Speak Program: Encourages creative thinking and confidence through self-expression and public speaking.
Math and English Activities: Expose students to interactive games related to English and Math, including Scrabble and business simulations.
Language: A strong emphasis on language ensures students are exposed to English and at least two other languages -  current offerings include Hindi and Dzongkha.

Affiliation
Taktse is currently affiliated with Cambridge International Examinations, recognized by the AIU (Association of Indian Universities), including Delhi University. Additionally, the school is also affiliating with ICSE in the near future to offer students a broader choice of boards.

Location
Taktse International School's 35-acre campus lies on the sprawling and verdant Maharani Estate at Pangthang. Connected to Gangtok by a 9  km all-weather road, the school stands at an elevation of nearly 2,000 m and offers panoramic views of Kangchenjunga and much of the Himalayan mountain range. It is home to one of the highest basketball courts in the world.

References

External links
 Taktse International School

International schools in India
Cambridge schools in India
Boarding schools in Sikkim
High schools and secondary schools in Sikkim
Gangtok
2006 establishments in Sikkim
Educational institutions established in 2006